Michela Antonia Montevecchi (born April 21, 1971) is an Italian politician.
 
She was elected to the Senate in the seventeenth Legislature with the 5 Star Movement in 2013, as the leading candidate of the district of Emilia Romagna.

She was re-elected to the Senate in the eighteenth Legislature with the 5 Star Movement in 2018.

On March 28, 2018 she was elected Secretary to the President of the Senate.

On June 21, 2018 she was elected Vice President of the Public Education and Cultural Heritage Commission.

Works
A sociolinguistic investigation into the meaning of peace: An investigation into the meaning of Peace in South African and Italian teenagers, Edizioni Accademiche Italiane, February 23, 2014,

References

External links

La pagliuzza e la trave, HuffingtonPost Italia 

Living people
1971 births
Members of the Italian Senate from Lombardy

Senators of Legislature XVII of Italy
Senators of Legislature XVIII of Italy